Michael Leifer CMG (November 15, 1933 – March 21, 2001) was a British International Relations scholar specialising in the politics and international relations of South East Asia.

He was a professor of international relations at the London School of Economics and also served as its pro-director from 1991-1995.

Leifer studied Political Economy at the University of Reading and subsequently took his doctorate at the London School of Economics in 1959 with a dissertation on "Zionism and Palestine in British Opinion and Policy, 1945-1949". Prior to his death in 2001 he was awarded the Companion Medal of the 'Most Distinguished Order of Saint Michael and Saint George' for his work in academia and study of Southeast Asia.

Bibliography 
Michael Leifer: Selected Works on Southeast Asia, compiled and edited by Chin Kin Wah and Leo Suryadinata, Singapore: Institute of Southeast Asian Studies, 2005
Dictionary of the modern politics of South-East Asia, - 3. ed. - London : Routledge, 2001
Asian nationalism, London : Routledge, 2000
Singapore's foreign policy : coping with vulnerability, London : Routledge, 2000
The ASEAN Regional Forum : a model for cooperative security in the Middle East, Canberra : Dept. of International Relations, Research School of Pacific and Asian Studies (RSPAS), Australian National University (ANU), 1998
The Asean regional forum : extending ASEAN's model of regional security, London : Oxford Univ. Press, 1996 
Dictionary of the modern politics of South-East Asia, London : Routledge, 1995
Vietnam and Doi Moi : domestic and international dimensions of reform, London, 1991
Cambodian conflict : the final phase?, London : Centre for Security and Conflict Studies, 1989
ASEAN and the security of South-East Asia, London : Routledge, 1989
The balance of power in East Asia, Basingstoke, Hampshire : Macmillan, 1986   
Indonesia's foreign policy, London : The Royal Institute of International Affairs, 1983 
Conflict and regional order in South-east Asia, London : International Institute for Strategic Studies, 1980  
Malacca, Singapore, and Indonesia, Alphen aan den Rijn : Sijthoff & Noordhoff, 1978   
Dilemmas of statehood in Southeast Asia, Vancouver : Univ. of British Columbia Press and Singapore : Asia Pacific Press, 1972
Constraints and adjustments in British foreign policy, London : Allen & Unwin, 1972   
Nationalism revolution and evolution in South-East Asia, Zug : Inter Doc., 1970   
The Philippine claim to Sabah, Zug : Inter Documentation Company, 1968   
Cambodia : the search for security, London : Pall Mall P, 1967

Further reading

References

1933 births
International relations scholars
Academics of the London School of Economics
Alumni of the University of Reading
Alumni of the London School of Economics
British political scientists
2001 deaths
20th-century political scientists